The Lederlin 380L (marketed in North America as the Ladybug) is an unconventional light aircraft developed in France in the 1960s, and marketed for homebuilding.

Development
François Lederlin developed the 380L from the Mignet HM.380 "Flying Flea", and eventually created a new aircraft sharing only its choice of wing profile and general configuration.

Like the Pou-du-Ciel, the 380L is a tandem wing design, with the forward wing mounted on a set of cabane struts forward of the cockpit, and designed to pivot in flight, to vary its angle of incidence. Otherwise, it is unlike the original Mignet HM.14, having side-by-side seating for two in a fully enclosed cockpit, and a neatly cowled engine. The fuselage is of steel tube construction, metal-skinned at the front and fabric-covered to the rear, and the wings have fabric-covered wooden structure. The tailwheel undercarriage is fixed.

Specifications

Notes

References
Taylor, Michael J.H. 1989. Jane's Encyclopedia of Aviation Studio Editions p. 570
Jane's All the World's Aircraft 1977-78. Jane's Publishing pp. 493–494

External links

 aviafrance.com
 Уголок неба

1960s French sport aircraft
Homebuilt aircraft
Tandem-wing aircraft
Single-engined tractor aircraft
Aircraft first flown in 1965